The Remix Album (titled The #1 Remixes (EP) in North America) is the first remix album by British singer Lisa Stansfield, released by Arista Records on 2 June 1998. It contains remixes of songs originally included on the 1997 album, Lisa Stansfield. The tracks were remixed by prominent US and UK producers: Hex Hector, Junior Vasquez, Victor Calderone, Frankie Knuckles, Hani, K-Klass, Mark Picchiotti, the Black Science Orchestra and the Dirty Rotten Scoundrels. The album garnered favorable reviews from music critics and reached number eighty-two on the Billboards Top R&B/Hip-Hop Albums chart.

Background
In 1997, Stansfield released her eponymous album, which spawned four number-one singles on the Billboards Hot Dance Club Songs: "People Hold On" (The Bootleg Mixes), "Never, Never Gonna Give You Up", "Never Gonna Fall" (two weeks at the top) and "I'm Leavin'". This success prompted Arista Records to release the album with remixes of songs from Lisa Stansfield.

Content
The album, titled The #1 Remixes (EP) was released in North America on 2 June 1998. It includes nine tracks remixed by prominent producers: Hex Hector ("I'm Leavin'"), Junior Vasquez and Victor Calderone ("Never Gonna Fall"), Frankie Knuckles and Hani ("Never, Never Gonna Give You Up"), the Dirty Rotten Scoundrels ("People Hold On"), K-Klass ("The Real Thing") and the Black Science Orchestra ("The Line"). In Europe, it was titled The Remix Album and released on 8 June 1998. It contains all the remixes from the North American edition plus one more remix of "The Real Thing" by Mark Picchiotti.

Critical reception

The album received positive reviews from music critics. According to Jose F. Promis from AllMusic, it is "more a showcase of hot dance remixers than anything else, which is all fine. It begins with the radio edit of the Hex Hector mix of 'I'm Leavin',' a melancholy ballad that absolutely shines as a dance track, and should have become a hit in a similar vein to Everything but the Girl's 'Missing.' Two mixes are included of her excellent interpretation of Barry White's 'Never, Never Gonna Give You Up,' one being a dreamy, joyful, sophisticated, rather mid-tempo remix courtesy of the legendary Frankie Knuckles, and the other being the revved-up 'Hani Mix.' 'Never Gonna Fall' makes two appearances as clubby remixes, with the Victor Calderone mix being more of a collection of beats than an actual song. A longer mix of the album version of the relentless 'People Hold On' is thrown in, as well as a single-length, funky mix of 'The Real Thing' and a sleek, housy, elegant take on 'The Line.' Promis stated that this album is an absolute must for fans of late-'90s dance music, and especially for fans of this extremely underrated songstress."

Commercial reception
The album entered the Billboards Top R&B/Hip-Hop Albums chart and peaked at number eighty-two.

Track listing

Charts

Personnel
Credits taken from AllMusic.

Walter Arias – photography
Ashley Beedle – mix
Dan Bewick – producer
Black Science Orchestra – producer
James Brown – mix
Mark Burdett – design, art direction
Terry Burrus – keyboards
Paul Cairo – bass
Victor Calderone – producer
Ian Devaney – original production and mix
Matt Frost – producer
Gomi – programming
Hani – producer
Hosh Gureli – compiled by
Hex Hector – producer
K-Klass – producer
Frankie Knuckles – producer
P. Dennis Mitchell – mix
Peter Mokran – original production and mix
Joe Moskowitz – keyboards, programming
Mark Picchiotti – producer
Mac Quayle – keyboards, programming
Gary Sanctuary – keyboards
Steve Smith – percussion
Lisa Stansfield – vocals
Junior Vasquez – producer
Leon Zervos – mastering

Release history

References

Lisa Stansfield remix albums
1998 remix albums